Elections to Manchester City Council were held on 3 May 2018, as part of the 2018 United Kingdom local elections. Although the council is normally elected in thirds, all 96 council seats were up for election due to boundary changes. Labour retained its near-complete dominance of the council. The sole change was that the Liberal Democrats gained a second seat in Didsbury West.

Background and Campaign
From 2014 to 2016, Labour were the only party represented on the council. In 2016, former MP John Leech won a seat in Didsbury West and sat as the only opposition councillor for two years.

On 9 April 2018, it was reported that the Labour Party had received formal complaints about Chris Paul, Labour councillor for Withington since 2011. There were social media comments describing women as “cows”, “slobs” and “bitches”, and inciting violence against women.  Greater Manchester Police, The Labour Party and Manchester City Council all launched investigations and Paul eventually apologised. Paul was re-elected in Withington ward with a reduced majority beating Lib Dem candidate April Preston.

Following reports of a last-minute search for eligibile candidates, the Manchester Conservative Party announced on 10 April, it would be fielding three candidates in all 32 wards within the city.

John Leech launched the Liberal Democrats 'Manchester Together' campaign.

Result

Council Composition
Prior to the election, the composition of the council was:

After the election, the composition of the council is:

Ward Results
Asterisks denote incumbent Councillors seeking re-election. All results are listed below:

Ancoats and Beswick

Ardwick

Baguley

Brooklands

Burnage

Charlestown

Cheetham

Chorlton

Chorlton Park

Clayton and Openshaw

Crumpsall

Deansgate

Didsbury East

Didsbury West

Leech's win in 2016 signified the first gain for any party in Manchester other than Labour for the first time in six years and provided Manchester with its first opposition for two years. After the 2018 election he was selected as Leader of the Opposition.

Fallowfield

Gorton and Abbey Hey

Harpurhey

Higher Blackley

Hulme

Levenshulme

Longsight

Miles Platting and Newton Heath

Moss Side

Moston

Northenden

Old Moat

Piccadilly

Rusholme

Sharston

Whalley Range

Withington

Woodhouse Park

References

External links

2018
2018 English local elections